James Herbert "Herbie" Brennan (born Ireland, 5 July 1940) is a lecturer and the author of over 100 fiction and non-fiction books for adults, teens, and children.

Biography
Brennan's Man, Myth & Magic was published by Yaquinto Publications in 1982; he had originally started developing it as a much smaller Roman-themed role-playing game called Arena, but the game continued to grow from its base as he developed it. Brennan also designed Timeship, the last roleplaying game published by Yaquinto Publications. Brennan wrote several different gamebooks, including a series of eight Arthurian adventures called GrailQuest (1984–1987), and two published only in French – Aztec Quest (1997) and Egyptian Quest (1997).

His works have been translated into approximately 50 languages, he has also written books on the Occult and New Age. More recently, his teenage novel Faerie Wars achieved The New York Times best-seller status in the United States and is now part of a five book series. He initially trained in esoteric teachings and Qabalah with the Fraternity of the Inner Light. He later became associated with Dolores Ashcroft-Nowicki and the Servants of the Light.

In 1995 he contributed two novels to the Horrorscopes series under the house pen name "Maria Palmer". In 1998 he published Martian Genesis an ancient astronaut book which claimed the human race is of extraterrestrial origin.

In 2003, Brennan published the children's book The Book of Wizardry: The Apprentice's Guide to the Secrets of the Wizards' Guild under the pseudonym "Cornelius Rumstuckle."  The book purports to instruct children on how to become a wizard; it discusses crafts such as making a wand, and includes astrological references throughout.  According to the biographical note on the back cover, Rumstuckle "joined the Wizards' Guild in 1514 and became its youngest president ever seventy-eight years later, a post he holds to this day." The novel stars "you" as you train to become a wizard (in wiccan style). You then participate in a "wizard's adventure" a game where you utilise the knowledge you gained after reading the book. The ending is ambiguous, leaving you with the location of the Wizards' Guild, possibly hinting a sequel. In 2011 Herbie Brennan's book The Secret History of Ancient Egypt was republished by Bedford Square Books.

Bibliography

Role Playing Games
Man, Myth & Magic
Timeship
The Monster Horrorshow

Gamebooks 

 Sagas of the Demonspawn: (Fire* Wolf) (1984)
 Sagas of the Demonspawn: (The Crypts of Terror) (1984)
 Sagas of the Demonspawn: (Demondoom) (1985)
 Sagas of the Demonspawn: (Ancient Evil) (1985)
 GrailQuest
 Horror Classic Gamebooks
Egyptian Quest (1997)

Non-fiction 

 Astral Doorways (1971)
 Five Keys to Past Lives (1972)
 Experimental Magic (1972)
 The Occult Reich (1974)
 An Occult History of the World (1976)
 Getting What You Want (1977)
 Good Con Guide (1978)
 Reincarnation (1981)
 A Guide to Megalithic Ireland (1982)
 Discover Your Past Lives: A Practical Course (1984)
 Mindreach (1985)
 The Reincarnation Workbook: A Complete Course in Recalling Past Lives (1989)
 The Astral Projection Workbook: How to Achieve Out-of-Body Experiences (1989)
 Mindpower : Succeed at School (1990)
 Mindpower: Secrets to Improve Your Image (1990)
 Aquarian Guide to the New Age (1990) (with Eileen Campbell)
 The Young Ghost Hunter's Guide (1990)
 Understanding Reincarnation: Effective Techniques for Investigating Your Past Lives (1990)
 How to Get Where You Want to Go (1991)
 Discover Astral Projection (1991)
 Discover Reincarnation (1992)
 True Ghost Stories (1993)
 The Dictionary of Mind, Body and Spirit (1994) (with Eileen Campbell)
 Body, Mind and Spirit: A Dictionary of New Age Ideas, People, Places, and Terms (1994) (with Eileen Campbell)
 Time Travel: A New Perspective (1997)
 Seriously Weird True Stories (1997)
 Magick for Beginners (1998)
 Martian Genesis (1998)
 The Little Book of Nostradamus: Prophecies for the 21st Century (1999)
 The Secret History of Ancient Egypt (2000)
 The Magical I Ching (2000)
 Magical Use of Thought Forms (2001)
 Occult Tibet (2002)
 Death – The Great Mystery of Life (2002)
 Tibetan Magic and Mysticism (2006)
 Whisperers - The Secret History of the Spirit World (2014)

The adventures of Barmy Jeffers
 Barmy Jeffers and the Quasimodo Walk (1988)
 Return of Barmy Jeffers and the Quasimodo Walk (1988)
 Barmy Jeffers and the Shrinking Potion (1989)

Faerie Wars Chronicles

 Faerie Wars (2003)
 The Purple Emperor (2004)
 Ruler of the Realm (2006)
 Faerie Lord (2007)
 The Faeman Quest (2011)

Other fiction

 Beyond the Fourth Dimension (1975)
 Power Play (1977)
 Greythorn Woman (1979)
 Dark Moon (1980)
 Mindreach (1985)
 The Curse of Frankenstein (1986)
 Dracula's Castle (1986)
 Monster Horrorshow (1987)
 The Crone (1989)
 Ordeal by Poison (1992)
 Ancient Spirit (1993)
 Marcus Mustard (1994)
 Capricorn: Capricorn's children (1995)
 Cancer: Black Death (1995)
 The Gravediggers (1996)
 Blood brother (1997)
 Kookaburra Dreaming (1997)
 Zartog's Remote (2000)
 Nuff Said: Another Tale of Bluebell Wood (2002)
 In Miss Whitts class.... Being bored... Question mark (2009)
 The Shadow Project (2010)
 The Doomsday Box (2011)

References

External links

  – as Herbie Brennan
 J. H. (Herbie) Brennan – biography at Servants of the Light
 
  
 Herbie Brennan at LC Authorities, 21 records, and at WorldCat
 Cornelius Rumstuckle at LC Authorities, 1 record, and at WorldCat

1940 births
Ancient astronauts proponents
Irish occult writers
Irish fantasy writers
Irish writers
Living people
New Age writers
Pseudohistorians
Role-playing game designers
People educated at Portadown College